Brandy Nālani McDougall is a Kānaka Maoli author, poet, educator, literary activist, and associate professor at the University of Hawaiʻi at Mānoa. She is the Hawai'i State Poet Laureate for 2023-2025.

Early life and education 
McDougall was born and raised on the island of Maui in the upcountry region of Kula. She is Kānaka Maoli with ancestral lineages to Hawaiʻi, Maui, and Kauaʻi and also has ancestry from China and Scotland. Having grown up around storytellers, McDougall has long since been exposed to moʻolelo, which comprises stories, genealogy, legend, myths, and history. Additionally, her father was a musician and a writer, which molded her understanding of poetry as a platform for her own telling of genealogy, culture, and memory. McDougall began reading when she was four years old as reading was important for the family.

McDougall graduated in Kamehameha Schools in 1994 and later attended Whittier College where she earned a BA in English. She received an MFA in creative writing from the University of Oregon, where she also spent time teaching poetry and Ethnic Studies. In 2002, she was awarded a Fulbright grant and went to Aotearoa to interview Indigenous Pacific Creative writers and studied Indigenous Pacific literature. McDougall attained a PhD in English with a specialization in Contemporary Kānaka Maoli literature in 2011 at the University of Hawaiʻi at Mānoa. She later received the Mellon-Hawaiʻi Postdoctoral Fellowship and Ford Foundation Postdoctoral Fellowship awards in 2013 as she worked to turn her dissertation into what would then become her monograph “Finding Meaning: Kaona and Contemporary Hawaiian Literature”.

Profession 
McDougall is an associate professor in the American Studies Department of the University of Hawaiʻi at Mānoa specializing in Indigenous Studies. Her fields of study include; Indigenous literatures and critical theory, American imperialism in the Pacific, Indigenous rights, and sovereignty movements. Her ongoing research focuses on the rhetorics and aesthetics of Indigenous womenʻs activist fashion within land and water protection movements.

Work

Literary criticism  
McDougall is the author of the first extensive study of contemporary Hawaiian literature, Finding Meaning: Kaona and Contemporary Hawaiian Literature. Published in 2016, Finding Meaning analyses kaona, which are hidden meanings in Hawaiian poetry, and features selections of fiction, poetry, and drama by Hawaiian authors such as Haunani-Kay Trask, John Dominis Holt, and Imaikalani Kalahele. Finding Meaning won the Native American Literature Symposiumʻs Beatrice Medicine Award for Published Monograph in 2017.

She co-edited Huihui: Navigating Art and Literature in the Pacific with Georganne Nordstrom and Jeffrey Carroll. Published in 2014, Huihui was the first anthology to navigate the interconnections between the rhetorics and aesthetics of the Pacific. It consists of critical essays, poetry, short fiction, speeches, photography, and personal reflections that cover a number of topics to not only intersect indigenous intellectual, political, and cultural traditions and innovations of the Pacific, but also to decolonize Oceania.

McDougall is also a contributor to numerous publications including The Value of Hawaiʻi 2: Ancestral Roots, Oceanic Visions (2014), and Kanaka ʻŌiwi Methodologies: Moʻolelo and Metaphor (2015).

Poetry 
McDougall wrote The Salt-Wind / Ka Makani Paʻakai, a poetry collection published in 2008 that tells of her positionality as a Kanaka wahine, a Hawaiian woman, in a colonized nation through childhood stories, belonging, and connection. Her second collection of poetry, Āina Hanau: Birth Land will be published in June 2023.

She has contributed her poetry to a number of publications and productions including Effigies: An Anthology of New Indigenous Writing (2009), a poetry album titled Undercurrent, and UPU'' a theatre production featuring poetry from Pacific authors that premiered at the Auckland Arts Festival in 2020.

 Community service 
McDougall once served as the project coordinator of events for the Council for Native Hawaiian Advancement, a non-profit organization based in the island of Oʻahu that works to improve the livelihoods of Kānaka Maoli. In 2011, McDougall co-founded the Ala Press, an independent publisher that displays the work of Indigenous Pacific Islanders, with Craig Santos Perez.
She currently serves as one of the associate editors of American Quarterly, the official publication of the American Studies Association. She is also on the board of directors for The Pacific Writers’ Connection, a non-profit organization that features the works of Indigenous leaders in the Pacific in hopes of spreading awareness to the concerns of Indigenous Peoples for their land and wellbeing.

 Awards and distinction 2023-2025 - Hawai'i State Poet Laureate2017 - College of Arts and Humanities Excellence in Teaching Award2017 - Native American Literature Symposiumʻs Beatrice Medicine Award for Published Monograph2013 - Mellon-Hawaiʻi Postdoctoral Fellowship2013 - Ford Foundation Postdoctoral Fellowship2012 - Richard Braddock Award2011 - Fulbright award2002''' - James Vaughan Award for Poetry

References 

University of Hawaiʻi at Mānoa faculty
Whittier College alumni
University of Oregon alumni
Living people
Writers from Hawaii
Activists from Hawaii
Academics from Hawaii
Year of birth missing (living people)